The 2009 Skyrunner World Series was the 8th edition of the global skyrunning competition, Skyrunner World Series, organised by the International Skyrunning Federation from 2002.

Same format of the season 2008.

Skyrunner World Series Races
The World Cup has developed in 7 races from April to October, in addition at the 8 trials.

Skyrunner World Series Trials
8 races in calendar.

References

External links
 Skyrunner World Series

2009